To kidnap is to unlawfully take someone away and confine them against their will.

Kidnap may also refer to:

Films
 Kidnap (1974 film), an Italian crime film 
 Kidnap (2007 film), a Hong Kong thriller film starring Karena Lam and Rene Liu
 Kidnap (2008 film), an Indian Hindi-language action thriller
 Kidnap (2012 film), a short film by Ahmed Nimal
 Kidnap (2017 film), an American thriller film
 Kidnap (2019 film), a Bengali action thriller film 
 Kidnap (Sinhala film), a Sri Lanka action film

Television
 "Kidnap", fifth episode of the 1964 Doctor Who serial The Sensorites
 Kidnap (TV series), later Inagaw na Bituin, a 2019 Philippine TV drama musical series

See also

 Kidnapping (disambiguation)
 Kidnapped (disambiguation)
 Kidnapper (disambiguation)